Zola is a crater on Mercury.  The crater was named after the French novelist and playwright Émile Zola by the IAU in 1979.

Bright areas on the central peak complex of Zola may be hollows.

Zola is located to the northeast of the Caloris basin.  The crater Nervo is to the south, Brahms is to the north, and Mansur is to the east.  The small crater Ailey is to the southwest.

References

Impact craters on Mercury